A samovar (literally "self-brewer") is a metal container traditionally used to heat and boil water. Although originating in Russia, the samovar is well known outside of Russia and has spread through Russian culture to other parts of Eastern Europe, as well as Western and Central and South Asia. Since the heated water is typically used to make tea, many samovars have a ring-shaped attachment around the chimney to hold and heat a teapot filled with tea concentrate. Though traditionally heated with coal or kindling, many newer samovars use electricity to heat water in a manner similar to an electric water boiler. Antique samovars are often prized for their beautiful workmanship.

Description
Samovars are typically crafted out of plain iron, copper, polished brass, bronze, silver, gold, tin, or nickel. A typical samovar consists of a body, base and chimney, cover and steam vent, handles, tap and key, crown and ring, chimney extension and cap, drip-bowl, and teapot. The body shape can be an urn, krater, barrel, cylinder, or sphere. Sizes and designs vary, from large, "40-pail" ones (though largely metaphorical, food-service sized samovars were often very large indeed), to smaller family-sized ones, holding , to those of a modest   size.

A traditional samovar consists of a large metal container with a tap near the bottom and a metal pipe running vertically through the middle. The pipe is filled with solid fuel which is ignited to heat the water in the surrounding container. A small (6 to 8 inch/15 to 20 cm) smoke-stack is put on the top to ensure draft. After the water boils and the fire is extinguished, the smoke-stack can be removed and a teapot placed on top to be heated by the rising hot air. The teapot is used to brew a strong concentrate of tea known as zavarka (заварка). The tea is served by diluting this concentrate with boiled water from the main container, usually at a water-to-tea ratio of 10-to-1, although tastes vary.

History

The origin and history of the samovar prior to the 18th century is unknown.
Connections exist to a similar Greek water-heater of classical antiquity, the autepsa, a vase with a central tube for coal. 
The Russian tradition was probably influenced by Byzantine and Central Asian cultures. Conversely, Russian culture also influenced Asian, Western Europe and Byzantine cultures. 
"Samovar-like" pottery found in Shaki, Azerbaijan in 1989 was estimated to be at least 3,600 years old. While it differed from modern samovars in many respects, it contained the distinguishing functional feature of an inner cylindrical tube that increased the area available for heating the water. Unlike modern samovars, the tube was not closed from below, and so the device relied on an external fire (i.e. by placing it above the flame) instead of carrying its fuel and fire internally.

The first historically recorded samovar-makers were the Russian Lisitsyn brothers, Ivan Fyodorovich and Nazar Fyodorovich. From their childhood they were engaged in metalworking at the brass factory of their father, Fyodor Ivanovich Lisitsyn. In 1778 they made a samovar, and the same year Nazar Lisitsyn registered the first samovar-making factory in Russia. They may not have been the inventors of the samovar, but they were the first documented samovar-makers, and their various and beautiful samovar designs became very influential throughout the later history of samovar-making. 
These and other early producers lived in Tula, a city known for its metalworkers and arms-makers. Since the 18th century Tula has been also the main center of Russian samovar production, with tul'sky samovar being the brand mark of the city. A Russian saying equivalent to "carrying coal to Newcastle" is "to travel to Tula with one's own samovar". Although Central Russia and Ural region were among the first Samovar producers, over time several samovar producers emerged all over Russia, which gave the samovar its different local characteristics. By the 19th century samovars were already a common feature of Russian tea culture. They were produced in large numbers and exported to Central Asia and other regions. 
The samovar was an important attribute of Russian households and taverns to tea-drinking. It was used by all classes, from the poorest peasants up to the most well-suited people. The Russian expression "to have a sit by the samovar" means to have a leisurely talk while drinking tea from a samovar. In everyday use samovars were an economical permanent source of hot water in older times. Various slow-burning items could be used for fuel, such as charcoal or dry pinecones. When not in use, the fire in the samovar pipe faintly smouldered. As needed it could be quickly rekindled with the help of bellows. Although a Russian jackboot сапог (sapog) could be used for this purpose, bellows were manufactured specifically for use on samovars. Today samovars are popular souvenirs among tourists in Russia.

Outside Russia 

Iran

Samovar culture has an analog in Iran and is maintained by expatriates around the world. In Iran, samovars have been used for at least two centuries (roughly since the era of close political and ethnic contact between Russia and Iran started), and electrical, oil-burning or natural gas-consuming samovars are still common. Samovar is samăvar in Persian. Iranian craftsmen used Persian art motifs in their samovar production. The Iranian city of Borujerd has been the main centre of samovar production and a few workshops still produce hand-made samovars. Borujerd's samovars are often made with German silver, in keeping with the famous Varsho-Sazi artistic style. The art samovars of Borujerd are often displayed in Iranian and Western museums as illustrations of Iranian art and handicraft.

Kashmir
Kashmiri samovars are made of copper with engraved or embossed calligraphic motifs. In fact in Kashmir, there were two variants of samovar. The copper samovar was used by Muslims and that of brass was used by local Hindus called Kashmiri Pandit. The brass samovars were nickel-plated inside. Inside a samovar there is a fire-container in which charcoal and live coals are placed. Around the fire-container there is a space for water to boil. Green tea leaves, salt, cardamom, and cinnamon are put into the water.

Turkey

Turkish samovars are popular souvenirs among tourists, and charcoal burning samovars are still popular in the fields.  However, in the modern homes they have been replaced with the çaydanlık (lit. "teapot"), a metal teapot with a smaller teapot on top taking the place of the cap of the lower one.  To make Turkish tea, the lower part is used to boil the water and the upper part, called demlik is used for concentrated tea.  Tea is poured first from the demlik and then diluted to the desired level with plain boiling water from the lower tea kettle.  The body is traditionally made of brass or copper, occasionally also silver or gold, but çaydanlık are now also made from stainless steel, aluminium, or ceramics with plastic, steel or aluminium handles.

Gallery

See also
 Authepsa
 Kelly Kettle
 Percolator

References

Further reading
 .

External links

 Russian Samovar at A History of Central Florida Podcast
 Making tea with a Samavar  at RussianTeaCake.com

Azerbaijani culture
Boilers (cookware)
Cooking appliances
Iranian cuisine
Iranian culture
Kashmiri cuisine
Russian culture
Russian inventions
Russian tea
Teaware
Turkish culture